Jarosław Biernat (6 September 1960 – 20 April 2019) was a Polish football midfielder. He died on 20 April 2019, aged 58.

References

External links
 Jarosław Biernat at worldfootball.net 
 Jarosław Biernat at eintracht-archiv.de 
 

1960 births
2019 deaths
Polish footballers
Pogoń Szczecin players
Legia Warsaw players
Eintracht Frankfurt players
Bundesliga players
2. Bundesliga players
Sportspeople from Szczecin
Expatriate footballers in Germany
Association football midfielders
Poland under-21 international footballers